Felimare californiensis, common name the California blue dorid, is a species of colourful sea slug or dorid nudibranch, a marine gastropod mollusk in the family Chromodorididae that eats dysideid sponges.

Distribution
This nudibranch is found in the Eastern Pacific Ocean along the Californian coast from Monterey Bay through Baja California. It became regionally extinct in the northern part of its range, disappearing completely from California by 1984. It reappeared beginning in 2003 and is now found in a few isolated places in California. It has been shown to be synonymous with Felimare ghiselini.

Description
Felimare californiensis has a blue mantle and foot with moderately large yellow-orange spots. The body grows to a length of 90 mm.

References

External links
 

Chromodorididae
Gastropods described in 1879